Kanjurmarg (Marathi pronunciation: [kaɲd͡zuɾmaːɾɡ]) is a railway station on the Central line of the Mumbai Suburban Railway network. Kanjurmarg railway station is the main access point for IIT Bombay, KV IIT Powai, NITIE, Hiranandani Gardens, and other locations in Powai. The station was opened on 26 January 1968 and It is named after the local Kanjur village.  It is the closest railway station to Powai which is not served by trains.

Platforms 
There are 2 platforms on Kanjurmarg station,

 Platforms No. 1 and 1A are for locals going towards Kasara or Khopoli

 Platform No. 2 is for locals going towards CSMT

References

Railway stations opened in 1968
Railway stations in Mumbai Suburban district
Mumbai Suburban Railway stations
Mumbai CR railway division